Xué Ér is the first book of the Analects of Confucius. According to Zhu Xi, a Confucian philosopher in the 12th century, the book Xue Er is the base of moral improvement because it touches upon the basic principles of being a "gentleman" (jūnzǐ).

Name 
Xué Ér consist of two separate Chinese characters. The first character Xué denotes "to learn" as a verb or "the research of something" as a noun. The following character Ér signifies a conjunction between two actions.

The titles of the Analects of Confucius are usually related to the first phrase of a given book. Likewise, the book Xué Ér's initial sentence in Classical Chinese starts with "Xué Ér":

Content 
Xing Bing's commentary of the Analects Lunyu Zhengyi listed several key words of the book Xué Ér. The key words include: Gentleman, filial piety, humaneness, doing one's best, trust, the foundation of a nation and the principles of an appropriate friendship.

In the book, Confucius opted for hospitality towards strangers and tolerance of ignorance. Confucius also emphasized on the importance of self introspection (through examples from his disciple Zengzi and his own sayings).

Sources 

Analects